Faulder is a railway point located in British Columbia, Canada, situated in a large valley ten kilometers west of the town of Summerland.  This is also the end point of the Kettle Valley Steam Railway.  Named after Evelyn Robert Faulder, it consists of many large acreages and agricultural farms.

Faulder has become an area of controversy lately as high levels of uranium have been found in the community's drinking water.

Notable people
 Calum Bird, entrepreneur and founder of Trelent, a cloud-based technology platform.

References

Unincorporated settlements in British Columbia
Populated places in the South Okanagan
Populated places in the Okanagan Country